Compo may refer to:

 Demoscene compo, a competition involving multimedia "demo" programs
 Compo Simmonite, a character from the British TV series Last of the Summer Wine, played by Bill Owen
 Slang for British army field rations
 Short for Composition ornament, a mouldable resin worked either by hand or more usually pressed into moulds to produce decorative work
 A slang word for Financial compensation
 Compo Company, a former record company in Canada which evolved into Universal Music Canada
 Compo, Connecticut, a residential and beach area of Westport, Connecticut
 The Compo–Owenoke Historic District 
 Compo (film), a 1989 Australian film
 Charles Compo, American composer and musician